Joseph Nelson may refer to:
Joseph Nelson (architect) (1876–1952), American architect
Joseph Bryan Nelson (1932–2015), British ornithologist
Joseph S. Nelson (1937–2011), American ichthyologist
Joe Nelson (born 1974), American baseball player
Joe Nelson (basketball) (1927–2009), American basketball player
Joe Nelson (wrestler), English freestyle sport wrestler